Indium(III) nitrate is a nitrate salt of indium. It reacts with sodium tungstate to form In(OH)WO4, [In(OH)2]2WO4, NaInWO4 or In2(WO4)3 depending on pH.

References

Indium compounds
Nitrates